Hypercodia is a genus of moths of the family Noctuidae. The genus was erected by George Hampson in 1910.

Species
Hypercodia disparilis (Walker, 1863) Peninsular Malaysa, Borneo
Hypercodia rubritincta Wileman & South, 1916 Taiwan
Hypercodia umbrimedia (Hampson, 1918) India (Meghalaya)
Hypercodia wheeleri Pinhey, 1968 Zimbabwe, Zambia, South Africa

References

Acontiinae